Asaperdina is a genus of longhorn beetles of the subfamily Lamiinae, containing the following species:

 Asaperdina brunnea Pesarini & Sabbadini, 1999
 Asaperdina regularis (Pic, 1923)
 Asaperdina sordida (Gressitt, 1951)
 Asaperdina whiteheadi (Gressitt, 1940)

References

Desmiphorini